Bruno Wilhelm Zilliacus (11 November 1877 – 3 July 1926) was an athlete, who competed at the 1908 Summer Olympics.

Sports 

He is also listed as a flag-bearer for Finland in the opening ceremony, although he carried a mere hand-written plaque.

Zilliacus participated the 30-kilometer cross-country skiing race at the Northern Games in Stockholm 1901, where he did not place in the top 11.

Zilliacus won the first beauty pageant in Finland, which was held in Helsinki on 8 March 1903.

He represented the clubs Sortavalan Seminaarin Voimisteluseura (Sortavala) and Ylioppilasvoimistelijat (Helsinki).

Other 
Born in Saint Petersburg in 1877, his parents were major Alexander Wilhelm Zilliacus and Sofia Vilhelmiina Manninen. He married Meri Naëmi Starck (1886–1974) in 1913, daughter of Werner Starck and Naëmi Ingman-Starck. They had children Margareta in 1914, Ulla in 1919 and Katarina in 1921. Ulla married Kaarlo af Heurlin in 1941.

He graduated as a physical education teacher from the University of Helsinki in 1902. He worked as a teacher in 1903–1926.

Zilliacus was the local chief of Sortavala White Guard. He fought in the Finnish Civil War on the Karelian front. He received the Cross of Liberty, 4th class. He reach the rank vänrikki, the lowest officer rank.

Zilliacus died of stomach cancer in the Mehiläinen Hospital in Helsinki in 1926. He was buried in Sortavala.

References

1877 births
1926 deaths
Athletes (track and field) at the 1908 Summer Olympics
Olympic athletes of Finland
Finnish male shot putters
Male beauty pageant winners
Finnish beauty pageant winners